Emmanuelle Houdart (born 1967 in Switzerland) is a Swiss artist and illustrator.

Biography
After studying at the Ecole des Beaux-Arts in Sion and graduating from the Ecole Supèrieure d'Arts Visuels in Geneve, Emmanuelle Houdart moved to Paris.

Since 1996 she has been working as a painter and illustrator, and recently also as a costume and textile designer. Her illustrations were turned into fabrics and costumes for the "Barnhominum" exhibition at the Salon du livre et de la presse jeunesse, Montreuil, 2011.

She contributes to many French magazines and newspapers such as Libération, Le Monde, Sciences et Vie Junior, Ça m'intéresse...

She has written and/or illustrated more than twenty books, published all around the world (France, Italy, Mexico, Germany...).

Books

Author
Les Trois Géants. Paris: Didier Jeunesse, 2000
J’y arrive pas. Paris: Seuil, 2001
Que fais-tu Fantine? : un livre de devinettes. Paris: Seuil, 2002
Monstres malades. Paris: Thierry Magnier, 2004 
Les Voyages merveilleux de Lilou la fée. Paris: Actes Sud junior, 2006 
L’Abécédaire de la colère. Paris: Thierry Magnier, 2008
La garde-robe. Paris: Thierry Magnier, 2010 
Tout va bien Merlin, Paris: Thierry Magnier, 2009
Abris, Mountreuil: Les Fourmis Rouges, 2014

Illustrator
Moi j’irai dans la lune : et autres innocentines. Paris: Grasset jeunesse, 1998. Text by René de Obaldia
Le Fils de la sorcière et du loup. Paris: Grasset jeunesse, 1999. Text by Chris Donner
Dico des monstres. Paris: Hachette jeunesse, 1999. Text by Élisabeth Brami
Contes et légendes de la peur. Paris: Nathan jeunesse, 2000. Text by Gudule
Poèmes à dire et à manger. Paris: Seuil jeunesse, 2002. Edited by Élisabeth Brami
Attention sortie d’école. Paris: Thierry Magnier, 2002. Text by Bertrand Legendre
Les Choses que je sais. Paris: Seuil jeunesse, 2003. Text by Laëtitia Bourget
Poèmes à lire et à rêver. Paris: Seuil jeunesse, 2003. Edited by Élisabeth Brami
Poèmes à rire et à jouer Paris: Seuil jeunesse, 2004. Edited by Élisabeth Brami
L’Apprentissage amoureux. Paris: Seuil jeunesse, 2005. Text by Laëtitia Bourget 
Poèmes à vivre et à aimer. Paris: Seuil jeunesse, 2005. Edited by Élisabeth Brami 
Le Château des enfants gris. Paris: Nathan jeunesse, 2005. Text by Christian Grenier
Dedans. Paris: Thierry Magnier, 2006. Text by Fani Marceau
Emilie Pastèque. Paris: Thierry Magnier, 2007. Text by Ludovic Flamant
Les Heureux Parents. Paris: Thierry Magnier, 2009. Text by Laëtitia Bourget 
Saltimbanques. Paris: Thierry Magnier, 2011. Text by Marie Desplechin
Une amie pour la vie. Paris: Thierry Magnier, 2012
L’argent. Paris: Thierry Magnier, 2013. Text by Marie Desplechin
Ma mère. Paris: Thierry Magnier, 2015. Text by Stéphan Servant

Grants and awards
2003: Prix Octogone, category Prix Graphique (CIELJ), for Les Choses que je sais
2003: Grant by the Centre national du livre for Monstres malades
2005: Bologna Ragazzi Award at the Bologna Children's Book Fair for Monstres malades '2006: Grand Prix SGDL du Livre Jeunesse for Les Voyages merveilleux de Lilou la fée2007: Grant by the Centre national du livre for L'Abécédaire de la colère2012: Grant by the Centre national du livre for L'Argent''

References

External links
 

1967 births
Swiss women children's writers
Swiss women writers
Swiss women illustrators
Swiss children's book illustrators
Swiss illustrators
Textile designers
Living people